In enzymology, a betaine-aldehyde dehydrogenase is an enzyme that catalyzes the chemical reaction

betaine aldehyde + NAD+ + H2O  betaine + NADH + 2 H+

The 3 substrates of this enzyme are betaine aldehyde, NAD+, and H2O, whereas its 3 products are betaine, NADH, and H+.

This enzyme belongs to the family of oxidoreductases, specifically those acting on the aldehyde or oxo group of donor with NAD+ or NADP+ as acceptor.  The systematic name of this enzyme class is betaine-aldehyde:NAD+ oxidoreductase. Other names in common use include betaine aldehyde oxidase, BADH, betaine aldehyde dehydrogenase, and BetB.  This enzyme participates in glycine, serine and threonine metabolism.

Structural studies

References

 
 
 
 
 

EC 1.2.1
NADH-dependent enzymes
Enzymes of known structure